The women's 1500 metres speed skating competition of the 2014 Sochi Olympics was held at Adler Arena Skating Center on 16 February 2014.

Qualification
A total of thirty-six speed skaters could qualify for this distance, with a maximum of four skaters per country. The top 20 of the 2013–14 ISU Speed Skating World Cup – Women's 1500 metres standings after the fourth World Cup race in Berlin secured a spot for their country. Then the additional 16 spots were awarded based on a time ranking of all times skated in the World Cup. A reserve list was also made.

Records
Prior to this competition, the existing world and Olympic records were as follows.

At the 2013 World Single Distance Speed Skating Championships the track record was set by Ireen Wüst at 1:55.38.

The following records were set during this competition.

OR = Olympic record, TR = track record

Results
On 24 November 2017, Russian athlete Olga Fatkulina was disqualified for a doping offence.

The races were started at 18:00.

OR = Olympic record, TR = track record

References

Women's speed skating at the 2014 Winter Olympics